World Championship Wrestling, Inc. (WCW) was an American professional wrestling promotion founded by Ted Turner in 1988, after Turner Broadcasting System, through a subsidiary named Universal Wrestling Corporation, purchased the assets of National Wrestling Alliance (NWA) territory Jim Crockett Promotions (JCP) (which had aired its programming on TBS).

For much of its existence, WCW was one of the top professional wrestling promotions in the United States alongside the World Wrestling Federation (WWF, now WWE), at one point surpassing the latter in terms of popularity. After initial success through utilization of established wrestling stars of the 1980s, the company appointed Eric Bischoff to executive producer of television in 1993. Under Bischoff's leadership, the company enjoyed a period of mainstream success characterized by a shift to reality-based storylines, and notable hirings of former WWF talent. WCW also gained attention for developing a popular cruiserweight division, which showcased an acrobatic, fast-paced, lucha libre-inspired style of wrestling. In 1995, WCW debuted their live flagship television program Monday Nitro, and subsequently developed a ratings competition against the flagship program of the WWF, Monday Night Raw, in a period now known as the Monday Night Wars. From 1996 to 1998, WCW surpassed their rival program in the ratings for 83 consecutive weeks.

Beginning in 1999, WCW endured significant losses in ratings and revenue due to creative missteps, and suffered from the fallout from the 2001 merger of America Online (AOL) and Turner Broadcasting parent Time Warner (later WarnerMedia, now known as Warner Bros. Discovery). Soon thereafter, WCW went out of business, and the WWF purchased select WCW assets in 2001, including its video library, intellectual property (including the WCW name and championships), and some wrestler contracts. The corporate subsidiary, which was retained to deal with legal obligations and reverted to the Universal Wrestling Corporation name, officially became defunct in 2017. Its headquarters were located in Smyrna, Georgia.

History

Origins
"World Championship Wrestling" was a television show produced by Georgia Championship Wrestling (GCW) since 1982. Jim Barnett (who had briefly owned the Australian promotion of that name) came to Atlanta in the 1970s during an internal struggle for control of GCW. Barnett ultimately became majority owner of the promotion, and began using his previous promotion's name for GCW's weekly Saturday television program in 1982. Following the events that became known as Black Saturday, in which GCW and its television program briefly came under the ownership of the WWF, the promotion was eventually purchased by Charlotte, North Carolina-based Jim Crockett Promotions (JCP), the promoter of the Mid-Atlantic territory immediately north of Georgia.

Influential wrestling magazine Pro Wrestling Illustrated and its sister publications thereafter habitually referred to JCP as "World Championship Wrestling", "WCW" and most commonly "the World Championship area" and continued to do so until early 1988 when it began referring to the company solely as the NWA, reasoning that "it has become apparent that the NWA and the World Championship area are one and the same."

By late 1988, JCP was financially struggling after further territory acquisitions. Ted Turner, the namesake principal owner of Turner Broadcasting, 
formed a new subsidiary in October 1988 to acquire most of the assets of JCP. The acquisition was completed on November 2, 1988. While initially the subsidiary was incorporated as the "Universal Wrestling Corporation", following the purchase the decision was made to utilize the familiar "World Championship Wrestling" as the name for the promotion.

Leadership and booking
WCW went through various changes in business and creative leadership during its existence. Some figures, like Jim Herd, were television executives lacking in wrestling-promotion experience; others, like Bill Watts, Ole Anderson, and Dusty Rhodes had extensive experience in the business, but were ineffective at growing WCW's largely regional audience, into a national—and international—one (as Vince McMahon had successfully done with the WWF).

Eric Bischoff combined an understanding of wrestling (largely gained as a staffer with Verne Gagne's American Wrestling Association) with a willingness to make the changes needed to raise WCW's profile with mainstream media, its target audience, and especially television advertisers. These changes included moving some television tapings from Atlanta to Disney-MGM Studios in Orlando, Florida, and signing a mix of veteran U.S. main-event performers and younger stars from promotions around the world (such as Rey Mysterio, Jr.). He also was responsible for launching WCW Monday Nitro in 1995, sparking the Monday Night Wars, and setting off a period of intense competition between WCW and the WWF that became the most-watched period in televised professional wrestling history. A second prime time series, WCW Thunder premiered on TBS on January 8, 1998.

Monday Night Wars

The Monday Night Wars were an era in professional wrestling where WCW's Monday Nitro and the WWF's Raw is War shows competed for ratings. Both shows aired on Monday. From 1995 to 1998, Nitro would dominate Raw until the January 4, 1999 episode of Raw, where the announcers of Nitro were told to spoil Raws main event, which was that Mankind would win the WWF Championship. Because of this, tons of WCW viewers changed the channel to watch Mankind win the title. After this, WCW's ratings would continue to decline and their last episode of Nitro aired on March 26, 2001, when they were bought by the WWF (now WWE).

Sale to World Wrestling Federation
In 2000, several potential buyers for WCW were rumored to show interest in the company. Ted Turner, however, did not hold influence over Time Warner before the final merger of America Online (AOL) and Time Warner in 2001, and most offers were rejected. Eric Bischoff, working with Fusient Media Ventures, made a bid to acquire the company in January 2001. One of the primary backers in the WCW deal backed out after AOL Time Warner refused to allow WCW to continue airing on its networks, leaving Fusient to take that offer off the table while it attempted to bring a new deal around. In the meantime, Jamie Kellner was handed control over the Turner Broadcasting division, and deemed WCW, along with Turner Sports as a whole, to be out of line with its image and saying that it "would not be favorable enough to get the "right" advertisers to buy airtime" (even though Thunder was the highest-rated show on TBS at the time). As a result, WCW programming was cancelled on TBS and TNT. In the book NITRO: The Incredible Rise and Inevitable Collapse of Ted Turner's WCW by Guy Evans, it is said that a key condition in WCW's purchase deal with Fusient was that Fusient wanted control over time slots on TNT and TBS networks, regardless of whether these slots would show WCW programming or not. This influenced Kellner's decision to ultimately cancel WCW programming. WCW's losses were then written-off via purchase accounting; according to Evans: "in the post-merger environment, the new conglomerate was able to 'write down' money losing operations, essentially eliminating those losses because of their irrelevancy moving forward."

The cancellation of WCW programming left the WWF free to acquire the trademarks, video libraries, and some contracts of WCW through its new subsidiary W. Acquisition Company, which was renamed WCW Inc. afterwards. AOL Time Warner maintained its subsidiary, which reverted to its original legal name of Universal Wrestling Corporation, to deal with legal obligations and liabilities not acquired by WWF. The UWC was listed as a subsidiary of Time Warner until 2017, when it was merged into Turner Broadcasting System.

Legacy
At the outset of WCW's existence, as well as that of its predecessors, the company was strongly identified with the Southern style of professional wrestling (i.e., "rasslin'"), which emphasized athletic and competitive in-ring performances over the showmanship and cartoon-like characterizations of the WWF. WCW dominated professional wrestling television ratings from mid-1996 to 1998 in the U.S. due to the New World Order storyline; but thereafter, began to lose ground to the WWF and its newly-established, edgy, antihero-driven Attitude Era programming. Former WCW workers, such as Stone Cold Steve Austin, Triple H, Mick Foley, and Chris Jericho, became established WWF superstars. By 1999, WCW was criticized for their lack of quality storylines and for questionable booking decisions, both of which contributed to their decline. 

AOL Time Warner sold the trademarks for WCW's name and logo to the WWF for $2.5 million in 2001, and shortly afterwards, WWF owner Vince McMahon purchased the entire WCW videotape library for an additional $1.7 million; bringing the final tally of WCW's sale to $4.2 million. The WWF initially kept the WCW United States Championship, WCW Cruiserweight Championship, WCW World Tag Team Championship, and WCW World Heavyweight Championship active and they were eventually unified with their respective WWF counterparts. 

WWE has since released various WCW documentaries, anthologies, and compilations; including The Rise and Fall of WCW, and a three volume series hosted by Diamond Dallas Page called The Very Best of WCW Monday Nitro. WCW's library content would be made available with the launch of WWE Network in 2014.

WWE would revive several of WCW's events; including Great American Bash in 2004, and Starrcade in 2017. Also in 2017, WWE held its first annual NXT WarGames event for its NXT brand, with that's year's event featuring the first WarGames match since the September 4, 2000 episode of Nitro.

After the closure of WCW, several new professional wrestling promotions would launch featuring former talent associated with WCW. Total Nonstop Action Wrestling (TNA), now known as Impact Wrestling, was founded by Jeff Jarrett in 2002, and would go on to take over WCW's market position in the mid-to-late 2000s. In 2019, new promotion All Elite Wrestling (AEW) formed a partnership with WarnerMedia to air their flagship show, AEW Dynamite, on TNT; returning professional wrestling to the network for the first time since WCW's closure. On January 5, 2022, Dynamite moved to TNT's sibling network, TBS, marking the first time TBS has aired wrestling programming since the March 21, 2001, episode of WCW Thunder. TNT still airs AEW's second show, AEW Rampage.

Championships

Programming

In other media

From 2000 to 2001, Monster Jam had a series of monster trucks based on wrestlers' names. These included the nWo, Sting, Nitro Machine, Madusa and Goldberg. Following the end of WCW, Debrah Miceli, the only one of the truck's namesakes to actually drive them, remained in monster trucks. The legacy of the other trucks is most prominent with Goldberg. Driven by to great success by Tom Meents (including Monster Jam World Finals championships both years the truck ran), after the end of the sponsorship Meents continued to run the truck as "Team Meents" in 2002 before debuting its new name Maximum Destruction in 2003. Max-D continues to compete in the series and rivals the legendary Grave Digger in popularity on the circuit.

WCW also had a presence in NASCAR from the mid-1990s to 2000, sponsoring the #29 team in the Busch Grand National Series full-time and the #9 Melling Racing team in the Winston Cup Series part-time. In 1996, Kyle Petty's #49 car in the Busch Grand National series was sponsored by the nWo, and Wally Dallenbach Jr. briefly drove a WCW-sponsored for Galaxy Motorsports.

Several WCW video games were made in the 1980s, 1990s and early 2000s, including WCW Wrestling, WCW SuperBrawl Wrestling, WCW vs. the World, and WCW Mayhem.

References

External links
www.wcwwrestling.com WCW official website (archived)
Information at WWE.com
DDT Digest - World Championship Wrestling Results and Commentary
WWE.com's WCW World Heavyweight Championship History

 
Entertainment companies disestablished in 2017
Entertainment companies established in 1988
Defunct companies based in Georgia (U.S. state)
Defunct brands
Defunct companies
Warner Bros. Discovery subsidiaries
Jim Crockett Promotions
National Wrestling Alliance
National Wrestling Alliance members
History of WWE
Former Time Warner subsidiaries
Organizations based in Atlanta
Mass media companies established in 1988
Mass media companies disestablished in 2001
WWE